Heaven Is Waiting is the second studio album by English gothic rock band The Danse Society. It was released in December 1983, jointly by record labels Arista and Danse Society's own label, Society.

Track listing

Release 

Heaven Is Waiting reached No. 39 in the UK Albums Chart, the highest chart placing of any of their albums.

Critical reception 

Heaven Is Waiting has been poorly received by professional critics. Trouser Press called the album "further plodding nonsense". AllMusic wrote, "Heavy on gloomy atmosphere [...] but short on memorable songs, Heaven Is Waiting failed to deliver on the promise Danse Society displayed early in their career", though commenting that the album "isn't without interest."

Personnel 
 The Danse Society

 Paul Gilmartin – drums
 Paul Nash – guitar
 Steve Rawlings – vocals
 Lyndon Scarfe – keyboards
 Tim Wright – bass guitar

 Technical

 Kingbird – production on tracks A1, A2, A5, B3 and B5, mixing on tracks A1, A5, B3 and B5
 Nigel Gray – production on tracks A3, A4, B1, B2 and B4
 Ian Caple – engineering on tracks A1, A5, B3 and B5
 Phil Thornalley – engineering on track A2
 Will Gosling – mixing on tracks A1, A3–A5 and B1–B5
 P. Swift – sleeve design
 Vaughan Arnell – sleeve design

References

External links 
 

The Danse Society albums
1983 albums